Yankeetown is a rural community in the Halifax Regional Municipality on Route 213, 25.8 km from Halifax, Nova Scotia.

References 
 Destination Nova Scotia
 Demographs

Communities in Halifax, Nova Scotia